The Revenge Rider is a 1935 American Western film directed by David Selman, which stars Tim McCoy, Robert Allen, and Billie Seward.

Cast list
 Tim McCoy as Tim O'Neil
 Robert Allen as Chad Harmon
 Billie Seward as Myra Harmon
 Edward Earle as Kramer
 Jack Clifford as Ludlow
 Frank Sheridan as Jed Harmon
 Jack Mower as Vance
 George C. Pearce as Dr. Lindsay
 Allan Sears as Lynch
 Harry Semels as Rankin

References

External links
 
 
 

1935 Western (genre) films
1935 films
American Western (genre) films
Columbia Pictures films
Films directed by David Selman
American black-and-white films
1930s English-language films
1930s American films